The 2014 Indian general election in Madhya Pradesh were held for 29 seats in the state. The major two contenders in the state were Bharatiya Janta Party (BJP) and the Indian National Congress (INC). The voting process was held in three phases on 10, 17 and 24 April 2014.

Result

|- align=center
!style="background-color:#E9E9E9" class="unsortable"|
!style="background-color:#E9E9E9" align=center|Political Party
!style="background-color:#E9E9E9" |Seats won
!style="background-color:#E9E9E9" |Seat change
|-
| 
|align="left"|Bharatiya Janata Party||27|| 10
|-
| 
|align="left"|Indian National Congress||2|| 9
|-
|
|align="left"|Total||29||
|}

List of elected MPs
Keys:

Bye-elections

Region-wise results

References

Indian general elections in Madhya Pradesh
2010s in Madhya Pradesh
2014 Indian general election by state or union territory